The Radio Research Board was formed by the Department of Scientific and Industrial Research in 1920. The Radio Research Station (1924 – 31 August 1979) at Ditton Park, Near Slough, Berkshire, England was the UK government research laboratory which pioneered the regular observation of the ionosphere by ionosondes. In continuous operation from 20 September 1932, it applied the ionosonde technology for the early developments which led to the British Chain Home radar system, operational during World War II.

In 1965, it was renamed the Radio and Space Research Station, to reflect its increasing role in space research. In 1974, it became the Appleton Laboratory, in honour of Sir Edward Victor Appleton, who had received the 1947 Nobel prize for his work on the ionosphere and who had long been associated with the station's research. In 1979, the laboratory merged with the Rutherford Laboratory to form the Rutherford Appleton Laboratory and over the next three years moved from Ditton Park to Chilton, Oxfordshire.

References

External links  
 http://www.datchethistory.org.uk/space%20research%20ditton/appleton.htm 
 https://www.gracesguide.co.uk/Radio_Research_Station

Radar
History of Buckinghamshire
Government agencies established in 1924
Research institutes established in 1924
1924 establishments in England
Government research
Government of the United Kingdom
Research institutes in Buckinghamshire